Danutė Domikaitytė is a Lithuanian freestyle wrestler. She won one of the bronze medals in the 68 kg event at the 2020 European Wrestling Championships held in Rome, Italy.

Career 

In 2018, she competed in the women's 68 kg event at the Klippan Lady Open in Klippan, Sweden. In March 2021, she competed at the European Qualification Tournament in Budapest, Hungary hoping to qualify for the 2020 Summer Olympics in Tokyo, Japan. She did not qualify at this tournament and she also failed to qualify for the Olympics at the World Olympic Qualification Tournament held in Sofia, Bulgaria. In October 2021, she competed in the 68 kg event at the World Wrestling Championships held in Oslo, Norway.

In 2022, she won one of the bronze medals in the women's 72 kg event at the Yasar Dogu Tournament held in Istanbul, Turkey. She competed in the 68 kg event at the 2022 World Wrestling Championships held in Belgrade, Serbia.

Achievements

References

External links 
 

Living people
Year of birth missing (living people)
Place of birth missing (living people)
Lithuanian female sport wrestlers
Wrestlers at the 2015 European Games
Wrestlers at the 2019 European Games
European Games competitors for Lithuania
European Wrestling Championships medalists
21st-century Lithuanian women